Ostrožská Lhota is a municipality and village in Uherské Hradiště District in the Zlín Region of the Czech Republic. It has about 1,500 inhabitants.

Geography
Ostrožská Lhota lies in the Vizovice Highlands, in the valley of the Okluky stream.

History
The village was founded during the colonization in the 13th or early 14th century, which indicated its name "lhota". The first written mention of Ostrožská Lhota is from 1371 in a deed of John Henry, Margrave of Moravia. At that time, the village was called Majori Lhota (Latin for "Great Lhota"). Other old documented names are Velká Lhota, Ostrovská Lhota and Ostrá Lhota.

In 1421, the so far Catholic parishioners had to follow the example of their master Hašek of Waldsheim and adopt the religion of the Moravian Church. In the Hussite Wars, they fought along with the Hussites. In 1511, John of Kunovice bought the land of Ostroh and his house later held it until the Thirty Years' War.

After the Battle of White Mountain, the last lord of the land, John Bernard of Kunovice, escaped to Transylvania and his property was bought in 1625 by Gundakar of Liechtenstein, whose descendants held the village until 1918. At the change of the 16th and 17th century (in the years 1663, 1674, 1699, 1705), the village suffered attacks by the Kuruc, Turkish and Tatar peoples from the Kingdom of Hungary and was repeatedly burned down.

During the Austro-Prussian War of 1866, the retreating Austrian soldiers spread an epidemic of cholera into the village, which caused a death of several dozens of its inhabitants.

Economy
In 2007, a photovoltaic power station was installed in Ostrožská Lhota, which in the time of its inauguration was the largest power station of this kind in Central Europe, reaching an output of 702 kWp.

Sights
The present parish Church of Saint James the Great was built in the late Baroque style in 1908, in the site of a demolished church building from 1832. Its tower originated from the oldest known church, collapsed in 1830.

The statue of Saint John the Baptist is from 1747.

References

Further reading

External links

Villages in Uherské Hradiště District